Kyrgyzstan competed at the 2022 Winter Olympics in Beijing, China, from 4 to 20 February 2022.

Kyrgyzstan's team consisted of one male alpine skier. Besides the skier, one coach and three officials also accompanied the team. Maksim Gordeev was the country's flagbearer during the opening ceremony. Meanwhile a volunteer was the flagbearer during the closing ceremony.

Competitors
The following is the list of number of competitors participating at the Games per sport/discipline.

Alpine skiing

Kyrgyzstan qualified one male alpine skier. Kyrgyzstan was represented by Maxim Gordeev.

See also
Kyrgyzstan at the 2020 Summer Olympics

References

Nations at the 2022 Winter Olympics
2022
Winter Olympics